This is a list of members of the 27th and current National Council of Austria, the lower house of the bicameral legislature. The 27th National Council was elected in the 29 September 2019 legislative election, and was constituted in its first session on 23 October 2019.

Originally, the National Council comprised 71 members of the Austrian People's Party (ÖVP), 40 members of the Social Democratic Party of Austria (SPÖ), 31 members of the Freedom Party of Austria (FPÖ), 26 members of The Greens – The Green Alternative (GRÜNE), and 15 members of NEOS – The New Austria and Liberal Forum (NEOS). In the constituent session of the National Council on 23 October 2019, Philippa Strache was expelled from the FPÖ. She has since sat as a non-attached member. As a result, the FPÖ group consists of 30 members.

The President of the National Council is Wolfgang Sobotka (ÖVP). The Second President is Doris Bures (SPÖ), and the Third President is Norbert Hofer (FPÖ).

Presidium

Parliamentary groups

List of current members

List of former members

References

Austria
Politics of Austria
Austrian Parliament
Organisations based in Vienna